is  the former Head coach of the Oita Ehime Heat Devils in the Japanese Bj League.

Head coaching record

|-
| style="text-align:left;"|Oita Ehime Heat Devils
| style="text-align:left;"|2015-16
| 24||6||18|||| style="text-align:center;"| Fired|||-||-||-||
| style="text-align:center;"|- 
|-

References

1979 births
Living people
Ehime Orange Vikings coaches

Japanese basketball coaches
Nippon Tornadoes players